Non pensarci is a 2007 Italian-language Comedy directed by Gianni Zanasi. The film follows Stefano Nardini a post-punk guitarist stuck in a strange career limbo.

Cast

Valerio Mastandrea: Stefano Nardini
Anita Caprioli: Michela Nardini
Giuseppe Battiston: Alberto Nardini
Caterina Murino: Nadine
Paolo Briguglia: Paolo Guidi
Dino Abbrescia: Carlo
Teco Celio: Walter Nardini
Gisella Burinato: Mamma Nardini 
Paolo Sassanelli: Francesco

External links
 
 
 

2007 films
Italian comedy films
2000s Italian-language films
Films about dysfunctional families
2000s English-language films
2000s Italian films